Conus nigropunctatus, common name the black-spot cone, is a species of sea snail, a marine gastropod mollusk in the family Conidae, the cone snails, cone shells or cones.

These snails are predatory and venomous. They are capable of "stinging" humans.

Description
The size of the shell varies between 25 mm and 50 mm. The bulbous shell has a convex, striate spire. The body whorl has rounded striate, which are usually obsolete above, granular below. The color is olive, chestnut-, chocolate- or pink-brown, variously marbled and flecked with white, often faintly white-banded below the middle. The shell is encircled by a series of chocolate-colored dots.

Distribution
This marine species occurs in the Red Sea and the Western Pacific

References

  Petit, R. E. (2009). George Brettingham Sowerby, I, II & III: their conchological publications and molluscan taxa. Zootaxa. 2189: 1–218
 Puillandre N., Duda T.F., Meyer C., Olivera B.M. & Bouchet P. (2015). One, four or 100 genera? A new classification of the cone snails. Journal of Molluscan Studies. 81: 1-23

External links
 To World Register of Marine Species
 Cone Shells - Knights of the Sea
 

nigropunctatus
Gastropods described in 1858